Carson Miller (born January 9, 1989) is an American racing cyclist, who last rode for American amateur team Velobody / Gerk's. He rode in the men's team time trial at the 2015 UCI Road World Championships.

Major results

2010
 10th Coupe des nations Ville Saguenay
2015
 10th Road race, National Road Championships

References

External links

1989 births
Living people
American male cyclists
Cyclists from Washington (state)
Sportspeople from Seattle